is a Japanese street photographer focusing in human photography based in Tokyo.

Life and career
Michio Yamauchi was born in a mountain village in Nishimikawa, Aichi (currently part of Toyota City) on October 23, 1950. He studied in the literature department at Waseda University, and after graduating, at 29 years old, entered night school at the Tokyo School of Photography (now Tokyo Visual Arts school.

In 1982, the same year he graduated from the Tokyo School of Photography, Yamauchi took part in an independent gallery known as Image Shop CAMP. During this time, Yamauchi studied under Daidō Moriyama. Afterwards, Yamauchi spent over 10 years as a freelance photographer, mainly participating in independent galleries where he would display photos he took around Tokyo. Yamauchi eventually focused on publishing books of his photography after publishing "To People" and "City"　(). From this point on, Yamauchi, whilst continuing photography in Tokyo, began heading overseas as well.

Awards
In 1997, Yamauchi won the 22nd Ina Nobuo Award for his exhibition "British Territory Hong Kong" at the Ginza Nikon Salon in Tokyo, Japan. Then, in 2011, he received the 20th Hayashi Tadahiko Award for his exhibition and photo album titled "Keelung". This award (林忠彦賞) is given annually by Shunan city and the Shunan City Museum of Art and History, started in 1992, in honor of the photographer Tadahiko Hayashi.

Collections
Yamauchi's collections can still currently be seen at the Tokyo Metropolitan Museum of Photography, the Shunan City Museum of Art and History, the Nikon Salon and other places throughout Japan.

Solo exhibitions
 1982 - "Noraneko - Stray Cats", Image Shop CAMP, Shinjuku, Tokyo
"Children", Image Shop CAMP, Shinjuku, Tokyo
 1983 - "Tokyo vol. 1 - vol. 10", February 1983 - February 1984, Image Shop CAMP, Shinjuku, Tokyo
 1984 - "Tokyo, That One", Minolta Photo Space (Currently, Konica Minolta Plaza), Shinjuku, Tokyo
 1985 - "Tokyo, Showa Year 60, August", Minolta Photo Space, Shinjuku, Tokyo
 1986 -  "Tokyo, February '83 to February '86", Olympus Gallery, Kandaogawa Town, Tokyo
 1992 - "To People", Minolta Photo Space
 1994 - "Shanghai Summer", Ginza Nikon Salon, Ginza, Tokyo
 1997 - "British Territory Hong Kong", Ginza Nikon Salon, Ginza, Tokyo
 1999 - "Waikiki", Ginza Nikon Salon, Ginza, Tokyo
 2002 - "Tokyo,東京", Ginza Nikon Salon, Ginza, Tokyo
 2004 - "Calcutta" (India), Konika Minolta Plaza, Shinjuku, Tokyo
 2005 - "Holiday" (Waikiki), independent gallery, Galleria Q (currently, 3rd District Gallery), Shinjuku, Tokyo
 2008 - "Tokyo", Sokyusha (independent gallery and bookshop), Shinjuku, Tokyo
 2010 - "Tokyo", December 2009, tōkyō 2009.12), 3rd District Gallery (independent gallery), Shinjuku, Tokyo
"Keelung", Sokyusha, Shinjuku, Tokyo
 2012 - "To People II" (hito e ni), Sekka Borderless Space, Nezu, Tokyo

Books
 Citｙ (machi), Sokyusha, 1992
 To People (hito e), independently published, 1992
 Shanghai (shanhai), independently published, 1995
, Sokyusha, 1997
 Noraneko - Stray Cats (noraneko), Mole, ., 1999
 TOKYO,Tokyo (tōkyō, tōkyō), Wise Publishing, ., 2003
 , Sokyusha, ., 2003
 Holiday "Waikiki", YK Publishing, 2005
 , Rathole Gallery, 2008
 Tokyo 2005-2007 (tōkyō 2005-2007), Sokyusha, 2008
 Keelung (kiirun), Grafica, 2010
 Tokyo 2009-2010 (tōkyō　2009-2010), Sokyusha, 2012
 To People II (hito e ni), Sokyusha, 2012
 DHAKA Tokyo-kirara sha Co., ltd 2015

Other publications/mentions
 1984 - Tokyo announced, Camera Mainichi (a magazine published by Mainichi Shimbun),September 1984,pp. 151–174.
 1985 - Street continuous publication, Camera Mainichi, January to April 1985 .
Snapshots published, Shashin Seikatsu(a monthly magazine published by Tatsumi Publishing)
 1986 - Photos displayed, Tokyo Human Encyclopedia (Tokyo Paris friendship cities memorial photo exhibition　東京人間図鑑), Paris
Record Tokyo (記録東京, kiroku tōkyō),FACE and NEW FACE in Shashin Jidai(a monthly magazine published by Byakuya Shobo)
 1987 - Photos displayed, New Photographic Possibilities, Setagaya Art Museum
 1990 - Photos displayed, Japanese (日本人) projected by Japan Foundation　, Moscow, Thailand, etc.
 1993 - Photos displayed, Breda Photographica (Asahi Camera, October 1993, p. 120), Holland
 1997 - Critique, Photographic Memory (写真的記憶) by Kazuo Nishii, pp. 179–180, pp. 305–307. Seikyusha, .
 1998 - Photos displayed, 20th Century Car Culture, Kiyosato Museum of Photographic Arts, Yamanashi, Japan
 2007 - Photos displayed, The New Collections: Vol. 1, Tokyo Metropolitan Museum of Photography, Ebisu, Tokyo
Photos displayed, Portraits of Showa: 1945-1989 , Tokyo Metropolitan Museum of Photography, Ebisu, Tokyo. Guidebook is Shouwa no fukei (昭和の風景), pp. 180–181.
Interview, Asahi Camera, November 2007, P. 235
 2008 - Photos published, Now, Snapshot Photography is Interesting in Capa (a monthly magazine published by  Gakken), October 2008, pp. 126–129.
 2010 - Photos displayed, 20th Century Portraits: All photographs are Portraits, Tokyo Metropolitan Museum of Photography
 2011 - Photos displayed, Scenes of Children: Part III Original Scenes Collection, Tokyo Metropolitan Museum of Photography. Guidebook is Kodomo no joukei, (こどもの情景 ), p. 137.
Photos published, 30 Years of Snapshot Photography in Capa, October 2011, pp. 78-79.
Photos displayed, 20th Tadahiko Hayashi Award Recipient Memorial Photography Exhibition, Shunan City Museum of Art and History, Yamaguchi, Japan
 2012 - Photos displayed, Tadahiko Hayashi Award 20th Anniversary Exhibition, Kawasaki City Museum, Kanagawa, Japan
Photos published, To People II in Nippon Camera, November 2012, pp. 90-96.

References

External links
 Michio Yamauchi official website

Japanese photographers
Street photographers
1950 births
Living people